Honored Artist of the Byelorussian SSR is the English translation of two different awards of the Byelorussian SSR, the older Soviet forms of two of the modern orders, decorations, and medals of Belarus. 

The English term "artist" is used to cover two Belarusian terms: artist (Belarusian Заслужаны артыст БССР, modern Заслужаны артыст Рэспублікі Беларусь) meaning "performer", and "maker of art" meaning visual arts or architecture (Belarusian Заслужаны дзеяч мастацтваў Рэспублікі Беларусь, Russian Заслуженный деятель искусств Республики Беларусь). 

The English term "Honored" (Belarusian Заслужаны Russian Заслуженный) is often translated "Meritorious" as in Meritorious Artist. This level of award is an award equivalent to the modern Merited Artist of Ukraine or Honored Artist of Russia, and these are lower level awards than the "National Artist" level awards such as the People's Artist of Russia, or People's Artist of the BSSR.

References

Orders, decorations, and medals of Belarus
Byelorussian Soviet Socialist Republic
Soviet awards
Awards established in 1927

be:Заслужаны дзеяч мастацтваў Рэспублікі Беларусь